CFYM is a Canadian radio station broadcasting a classic hits format at 1210 AM. Licensed to Kindersley, Saskatchewan, it serves west central Saskatchewan. It first began broadcasting in 1986 after receiving approval by the CRTC. It is a repeater for CJYM in Rosetown. CFYM broadcasts with a power of 1,000 watts daytime, 250 watts nighttime.

The station is currently owned by Golden West Broadcasting.

See also
CJYM

References

External links
CFYM 1210

FYM
FYM
FYM
Radio stations established in 1986
1986 establishments in Saskatchewan
Kindersley